James F. McGovern (born November 28, 1946) was United States Under Secretary of the Air Force from 1986 to 1989.

Early life, education and career
James F. McGovern was born in Dayton, Ohio, on November 28, 1946. He was educated at the United States Naval Academy, receiving a B.S. in 1969. He then served in the United States Navy on active duty from 1969 to 1979, at which time he became a member of the United States Marine Corps Reserve.

McGovern received a Juris Doctor degree from the Georgetown University Law Center, in Washington, D.C., in 1978.

From 1978 to 1981, he was an associate attorney at the law firm of Dickstein Shapiro in Washington, D.C. He then spent 1981 and 1982 as general counsel of the United States Senate Committee on Armed Services under the chairmanship of U.S. Senator John Tower (Republican Party senator from Texas). He was promoted to become the committee's staff director and chief counsel in 1982, holding that post until 1987.

On September 17, 1986, U.S. President Ronald Reagan nominated McGovern to be U.S. Under Secretary of the Air Force. He then served as Acting U.S. Secretary of the Air Force from December 1988 until April 1989.

Post-government career
After leaving government service, McGovern spent seven years as the president of Teledyne Brown Engineering. He later served as the president of Tripolis Technologies, a managing director of El Camino Capital Partners, the chief executive officer of Dunhill Technologies, a senior managing director of McGovern & Associates, and as the chief executive officer of Calpoint. In 2005, he became a member of the board of directors of the Parsons Corporation and in 2016 joined the board of Ingram Micro.

References

1946 births
20th-century American businesspeople
20th-century American military personnel
20th-century United States government officials
21st-century American businesspeople
21st-century American military personnel
American chief executives
American corporate directors
Businesspeople from Dayton, Ohio
Businesspeople from Washington, D.C.
Georgetown University Law Center alumni
Living people
Reagan administration personnel
United States Secretaries of the Air Force
United States Senate lawyers
United States Marine Corps reservists
United States Naval Academy alumni
Lawyers from Washington, D.C.